Lalung may refer to:
 Lalung people (Tiwa) an ethnic group of India
 Lalung language (Tiwa) a Sino-Tibetan language of India
 Machal Lalung, a miscarriage of justice victim from India

See also 
 Lalong (disambiguation)

Language and nationality disambiguation pages